The Ukraine national badminton team represents Ukraine in international badminton team competitions. Ukraine participated in the Thomas Cup, the Uber Cup and the Sudirman Cup as part of the Soviet Union. After the abolishment of the USSR in 1991, the Ukrainian Badminton Federation was formed and the national team has been competing under the Ukrainian flag ever since.

In 2022, amidst the Russo-Ukrainian conflict, many national Ukrainian players have fled the country to train in other countries, with some having to train in England at the Milton Keynes National Badminton Centre.

Participation in BWF competitions

Thomas Cup 
1952–1990 – Part of the 
1992–2022 – Did not qualify

Uber Cup
1957-1990 – Part of the 
1992–2022 – Did not qualify

Sudirman Cup 
1989-1991 – Part of the 
1993 – 31st
1995 – 27th
1997 – 23rd
1999 – 15th
2001 – 13th
2003 – 13th
2005 – 16th
2007 – 24th
2009 – 19th
2011 – 17th
2013 – 22nd
2015–2019 – Did not enter
2021 – Did not qualify

Participation in Badminton Europe competitions

Men's Team

Women's Team

Mixed Team

Participation in European Junior Team Badminton Championships
Mixed Team

Current squad 
The following players were selected to represent the Ukraine at the 2020 European Men's and Women's Team Badminton Championships.

Male players
Artem Pochtarov
Danylo Bosniuk
Valeriy Atrashchenkov
Glib Beketov
Ivan Druzchenko
Oleksandr Kolesnik
Mykhaylo Makhnovskiy
Gennadiy Natarov
Dmytro Zavadsky

Female players
Maryna Ilyinskaya
Arina Marushchak
Anna Mikhalkova
Yevgeniya Paksyutova
Anastasiya Prozorova
Valeriya Rudakova
Maria Ulitina
Natalya Voytsekh
Yelyzaveta Zharka

External links
UBF Official website

References

Badminton
National badminton teams
Badminton in Ukraine